Gilbert Walker may refer to:

Gilbert Walker (cricketer) (1888–1952), English cricketer
Gilbert Walker (physicist) (1868–1958), English physicist
Gilbert Carlton Walker (1833–1885), American politician